Joseph A. Goodson (December 1, 1876 – August 29, 1924) was a college football player and physician. He was a quarterback for the Vanderbilt Commodores football team; captain of the 1898 team. Goodson led the team to its first conference title in 1897. The team then played a contest with Virginia for the championship of the south, a tie. The Nashville American reported that, "The Vanderbilt players were in a jolly humor yesterday with their miniature football pinned upon the labels of their coats. Joe Goodson, quarterback, was apparently out of training from a large ten-cent cigar he smoked, a gift of Benjamin Childers of Pulaski. 'Tab' Farrell had his hair cut and other members were more or less changed in appearance."

References

1876 births
Vanderbilt Commodores football players
American football quarterbacks
Physicians from Kentucky
1924 deaths
Players of American football from Louisville, Kentucky
19th-century players of American football